Ferenc Novák (born July 13, 1969 in Budapest) is a Hungarian sprint canoeist who has competed from the early 1990s to 2006. At the 2000 Summer Olympics in Sydney, he won a gold medal in the C-2 500 m event with teammate Imre Pulai.

In the four-man (C-4) canoe he has won a total of three world championship gold medals (1993, 1994 and 2003), as well as two European golds (2002 and 2004). Novák won a total of six medals at the ICF Canoe Sprint World Championships.

His last success came at the 2006 European Championships, held in Račice, Czech Republic, where he won a C-4 500 m bronze medal.

Novak is currently a member of the Budapest Honvéd FC club.

Height: 173 cm (5'8"); weight 77 kg (169 lbs)

Awards
 Perpetual champion of Hungarian Kayak-Canoe

Orders and special awards
   Order of Merit of the Republic of Hungary – Officer's Cross (2000)

References

External links
 
 
 
 

1969 births
Budapest Honvéd FC canoers
Canoeists at the 2000 Summer Olympics
Hungarian male canoeists
Living people
Olympic gold medalists for Hungary
Olympic canoeists of Hungary
Canoeists from Budapest
Olympic medalists in canoeing
ICF Canoe Sprint World Championships medalists in Canadian
Medalists at the 2000 Summer Olympics